Queensland is a census-designated place south of Upper Marlboro in Prince George's County, Maryland, United States. The population of the CDP was 2,191 at the 2020 census. It was formerly known as Queenland until 2014 when its name was changed to Queensland and a small portion of its geography was transferred to Upper Marlboro.

Geography

The CDP is bordered to the north by Maryland Route 4, to the south and east by U.S. Route 301, and to the west by Marlboro Pike and South Osborne Road. The CDPs of Westphalia, Marlboro Village, and Brock Hall border Queensland to the north, Croom is to the southeast, Marlton is to the south, and Rosaryville is to the southwest.

Demographics

2020 census

Note: the US Census treats Hispanic/Latino as an ethnic category. This table excludes Latinos from the racial categories and assigns them to a separate category. Hispanics/Latinos can be of any race.

Education
Prince George's County Public Schools operates public schools serving the census-designated place. Most of the CDP is zoned to Marlton Elementary School, with a section instead zoned to Melwood Elementary School.

Residents are zoned to James Madison Middle School, and Dr. Henry A Wise, Jr. High School.

References

Census-designated places in Prince George's County, Maryland
Census-designated places in Maryland